Fredrick "Fred" Obi (born September 7, 1990) is an American football cornerback who is currently a free agent. He was assigned to the San Jose SaberCats on March 16, 2015. As a rookie, Obi recorded four interceptions and 43 tackles in only seven games. He played in all three of the SaberCats' 2015 playoff games, including the team's ArenaBowl XXVIII victory over the Jacksonville Sharks. On January 15, 2016, Obi was assigned to the Los Angeles KISS. On March 20, 2017, he was assigned to the Cleveland Gladiators. He earned Second Team All-Arena honors in 2017. On March 20, 2018, Obi was assigned to the Baltimore Brigade. On May 2, 2018, he was placed on recallable reassignment. On June 8, 2018, he was assigned to the Washington Valor. On March 22, 2019, Obi was again assigned to the Valor

References

External links
San Jose SaberCats bio 
University of San Diego Toreros bio

1990 births
Living people
American football cornerbacks
African-American players of American football
San Diego Toreros football players
San Jose SaberCats players
Los Angeles Kiss players
Cleveland Gladiators players
Baltimore Brigade players
Washington Valor players
Players of American football from Inglewood, California